Undead is a collective name for supernatural entities that are deceased yet behave as if alive.

Undead or The Undead may also refer to:

Fictional characters
 Undead (Dungeons & Dragons), a classification of monsters in Dungeons & Dragons
 Undead (Kamen Rider), a race of monsters in the TV series Kamen Rider Blade
 Undead (Warhammer), an army of monsters in Warhammer games
 Undead, a type of character in Heroscape
 Skeleton (undead), undead manifested as skeletons

Film
 The Undead (film), a 1957 horror film directed by Roger Corman
 Undead (film), a 2003 horror comedy film

Music 
 Undead (Six Feet Under album), 2012
 Undead (Tad Morose album), or the title song, 2000
 Undead (Ten Years After album), 1968
 "Undead" (song), by Hollywood Undead, 2008
 "Undead", a song by The Haunted from The Haunted
 The Undead, an American horror punk band, or a 1995 album by the band

Other uses
 Undead (series), a series of vampire romance novels by MaryJanice Davidson
 Undead (board game), a 1981 game from Steve Jackson Games
 Undead (Mayfair Games), a 1986 supplement for fantasy role-playing games published by Mayfair Games